{{DISPLAYTITLE:C20H26N2O}}
The molecular formula C20H26N2O (molar mass: 310.43 g/mol, exact mass: 310.2045 u) may refer to:

 Anilopam
 Ibogaine
 Tabernanthine
 Viqualine

Molecular formulas